Jyothi Surekha Vennam (born 3 July 1996, Vijayawada, India) is a right handed Indian archer.

At the age of 4, she was entered in the Limca Book of Records after crossing the Krishna River three times with a distance of 5 km in three hours, 20 minutes and six seconds. In various national and international competitions, she bagged 98medals.

Early life 
Jyothi was born in Hyderabad on July 3, 1996 to Vennam Surendra Kumar and Sri Durga. Her father is a former Kabaddi player and now a veterinary doctor in Vijayawada and mother is a home-maker. Jyothi completed her schooling and intermediate from Nalanda Institute.

Career 
At the age of 13, she won an Olympic round gold medal at the Mexican Grand Prix. At the Mexican Grand Prix, she also won bronze (20m) and three silver (50m and 40m).

In 2011, she won two bronze medals at the 2011 Asian Archery Championships

In January 2022, she finished in first place in the Women’s Open Pro event at the Lancaster Archery Classic held near Lancaster, Pennsylvania, United States.

Awards and accolades 
In 2017, Chief Minister N. Chandrababu Naidu awarded her a cash prize of Rs. 1 crore along with a housing site of 500 sq. yards in Vijayawada or Amaravati, after she was awarded the Arjuna Award for her achievements in the field of Archery. Surekha was youngest to be awarded this award in South India and also the first sportsperson to receive it after the Andhra Pradesh state bifurcation.
 2015 Asian Archery Championships: Women Individual.
 Arjuna Awards in the year 2017
Won two Bronze medals in World Archery Championship in Hertogenbosch in 2019

References

External links 
 

1996 births
Indian female archers
Sportswomen from Andhra Pradesh
Living people
Asian Games medalists in archery
Archers at the 2014 Asian Games
Archers at the 2018 Asian Games
Asian Games silver medalists for India
Asian Games bronze medalists for India
Medalists at the 2014 Asian Games
Medalists at the 2018 Asian Games
Sportspeople from Vijayawada
21st-century Indian women
21st-century Indian people
Universiade medalists in archery
Archers from Andhra Pradesh
Universiade medalists for India
Medalists at the 2015 Summer Universiade
World Archery Championships medalists
Competitors at the 2022 World Games
World Games bronze medalists
World Games medalists in archery